Doctor Joan Merle Woodberry AM (10 February 1921 – 31 January 2010), born in Narrabri, New South Wales was an Australian author and teacher. She was made a member of the Order of Australia in 1981 for services to literature and education, and was awarded an Honorary Doctorate from the University of Tasmania in 2000.

Bibliography

Children's fiction

 Rafferty Takes to Fishing (1959)
 Floodtide for Rafferty (1960)
 Rafferty Rides a Winner (1961)
 Come Back Peter (1968)
 Ash Tuesday (1968)
 The Cider Duck (1969)
 Little Black Swan (1970)
 A Garland of Gannets (1970)

Edited

 Andrew Bent and the Freedom of the Press in Van Diemen's Land (1972)
 The Honour Book : Short Stories, Articles, Poetry (1978)
 An Anthology of Short Stories, Articles and Poems by Tasmanian Authors (1979)

Non-fiction
 Historic Hobart Sketchbook (1976) with Frank Mather
 New Norfolk Sketchbook (1977) with John Alty

References

1921 births
2010 deaths
20th-century Australian novelists
Australian children's writers
Australian non-fiction writers
Australian women novelists
20th-century Australian women writers
Members of the Order of Australia